Chalte Chalte may refer to:

 Chalte Chalte (1976 film), a 1976 Indian film directed by Sunder Dar
 Chalte Chalte (2003 film), a 2003 Indian film directed by Aziz Mirza
 "Chalte Chalte", a 1972 song written by Kaifi Azmi and sung by Lata Mangeshkar, from the film Pakeezah
 "Chalte Chalte", a 2000 song written by Anand Bakshi, from the film Mohabbatein
 "Chalte Chalte", a 2008 song by Jal